Mana Island belongs to the Mamanuca Islands, Fiji. Mana was used as a tribe name in Survivor: Game Changers.

Facilities
Mana Island Airport is located there. The island is a home to a private resort.

References

Islands of Fiji
Mamanuca Islands